Avalanche Records Alternative Christmas is a Christmas album, in CD-R format, made up of contributions from Scottish bands and musicians. Released by Avalanche Records in Edinburgh, it raised money for charities Street Invest and the Royal Hospital for Sick Children, Edinburgh.

Reception
Both The List and The Skinny awarded the album four stars out of five.

Tracklisting
 "In Excelsis Deo" - There Will Be Fireworks
 "Christmastime in the Mountains" - The Savings & Loan
 "December & Whisky" - Rob St John
 "It’s Christmas So We'll Stop" - Frightened Rabbit
 "But Once a Year" - Pictish Trail
 "Sleep the Winter" - Eagleowl
 "It's a Wonderful Lie" - Withered Hand
 "Christmas in Kirkcaldy" - Meursault
 "Holy" - Emily Scott
 "Atoms" - Money Can't Buy music
 "Xmas in New York" - Saint Jude's Infirmary
 "All So Tired" - Broken Records
 "Shallow Footprints in the Snow" - Ballboy
 "Little Drum Machine Boy" - X-Lion Tamer
 "In Scotland It Never Snowed, In Canada It Did" - Zoey Van Goey

 "Christmas in Kirkcaldy" is a cover of "No Christmas in Kentucky" by Phil Ochs

References

Christmas compilation albums
2009 Christmas albums
Christmas albums by Scottish artists
2009 compilation albums
Alternative rock Christmas albums